Kelsey Serwa (born September 1, 1989) is a Canadian retired freestyle skier who was a member of the Canadian national ski cross team. She won a gold medal at the 2018 Winter Olympics in Pyeongchang and a silver medal at the 2014 Winter Olympics in Sochi. She is the 2011 FIS World Champion and two times Winter X Games champion. In addition, she has won a bronze medal at the 2010 X Games.

Competitive career
Serwa won a national championship in 2009 at Canada Olympic Park in Calgary, defeating world champion Ashleigh McIvor. Serwa won her first world cup event on January 13, 2009 at the Alpe d'Huez course after these finals were canceled on the 2009–10 Freestyle Skiing World Cup. Serwa won her first outright world cup race later that season at Lake Placid on January 24, 2010.

At the 2010 Winter X Games two weeks before the Olympics, Serwa managed to win a bronze at the famous cash event, fellow countrywoman Ashleigh McIvor had finished second. Serwa was a member of the Canadian Olympic team that competed in Vancouver in her home province of British Columbia. Serwa's bronze at the Winter X Games and third overall ranking on the world cup put her in as a medal favourite at the Olympics in Vancouver. She advanced to the semi-finals, but finished third in her heat and did not make the medal final. However, she competed in the "small final", which she won, finishing fifth overall.

During the next season Serwa won the gold at the X Games with a dramatic finish flying 150 feet in the air and crashing out badly injured, but the champion. Serwa carried her X Games winning momentum into the 2011 World Championships. There she qualified as the fourth fastest skier, Serwa then went on to finish first in the final ahead of teammate Julia Murray. With the victory she completed the seasonal sweep of the two biggest ski cross events in the world.

On February 21, 2014, Serwa won silver in women's ski cross during her second Olympics, finishing behind gold medalist and Canadian teammate Marielle Thompson.

Serwa suffered a training accident in December 2016 and considered retirement from ski cross, but ultimately returned to the sport following knee surgery.  She subsequently earned a place on Canada's ski cross team for the 2018 Winter Olympics in Pyeongchang. Serwa went on to win the gold medal in women's ski cross, with her teammate Brittany Phelan winning the silver medal.

On July 4, 2019, Serwa announced her retirement from competitive ski cross, after ten years on the national team.

Personal life
Serwa's grandfather, Clifford Jack Serwa, was a co-founder of the Big White Ski Resort, and later a longtime member of the Legislative Assembly of British Columbia representing Okanagan.  Serwa married Stan Rey, a retired competitive ski cross athlete, in 2019.  She began studying kinesiology at the University of British Columbia at Okanagan.

World Cup results
All results are sourced from the International Ski Federation (FIS).

Season standings

Race Podiums
 8 wins – (8 SX)
 20 podiums – (20 SX)

Olympic results
 2 medals – (1 gold, 1 silver)

World Championships results
 1 medal – (1 gold)

a.  Kelsey Serwa suffered a knee injury in the training and was unable to compete in the race.

References

External links

 
 
 
 
 
CBC Sochi 2014 profile
Alpine Canada profile

1989 births
Living people
Canadian female freestyle skiers
Freestyle skiers at the 2010 Winter Olympics
Freestyle skiers at the 2014 Winter Olympics
Freestyle skiers at the 2018 Winter Olympics
Medalists at the 2014 Winter Olympics
Medalists at the 2018 Winter Olympics
Olympic freestyle skiers of Canada
Olympic medalists in freestyle skiing
Olympic gold medalists for Canada
Olympic silver medalists for Canada
Sportspeople from Kelowna
X Games athletes